Booker T. Washington Magnet High School (BTW) is a public magnet high school in Montgomery, Alabama.

History
Carver Creative and Performing Arts Center (CCPAC) was the first magnet school in the Montgomery Public Schools (MPS) school district. CCPAC, originally located at George Washington Carver High School, was developed in 1982 to accommodate the growing need in Montgomery for specialized arts instruction for students. CCPAC began as a day program where students were bused from home schools to the Carver High School campus for magnet classes. As the program expanded and enrollment grew, the need to find a new location became more and more apparent.

In 1994, MPS received a $7,000,000 federal grant to fund several magnet schools including the Carver Creative and Performing Arts Center. A former shopping mall, Normandale Shopping Center, was selected as the future location for CCPAC, but in 1995, the shopping center was destroyed by a tornado. As a result, CCPAC began to operate out of four locations while searching for a replacement home. In 1996, CCPAC became a designated magnet school on the campus of the old Booker T. Washington School, at which time the name of the school and its program changed to Booker T. Washington Magnet High School.

Curriculum 
The school's arts program is divided into four "magnet" centers, each housing their own areas of study which are called magnets.

Creative and Performing Arts Center 
Choral magnet

Concert and Show Band magnets

Creative Writing magnet

Photography magnet

Piano magnet

Strings magnet

Technical Theater magnet

Theater and Musical Theater magnets

Visual Art magnet

Center for Advanced Technology 
Center for Advanced Technology (CAT) magnet

Center for Law 
Law magnet

Academy for Communication Arts 
Broadcast Media magnet

Admission 
Acceptance into BTW is based on successfully completing an audition/interview for the student's desired magnet area in addition to meeting school GPA and conduct requirements.

Locations 
George Washington Carver High School (1983-1996)
From its inception in 1983 to 1996, the magnet arts program was housed at George Washington Carver High School under the name Carver Creative and Performing Arts Center (CCPAC).

Simultaneous separate locations (1995-1996)
For a short time, CCPAC operated out of four locations simultaneously, including First Baptist Church (South Perry Street, Montgomery, Alabama), a Montgomery Public Schools Professional Services Building, and the former Booker T. Washington High School.

Booker T. Washington Magnet High School (1996-2018)
In 1996, a federal grant enabled the school to become its own designated magnet school (rather than a day program) housed on the campus of the old Booker T. Washington School; it was at this time that the arts magnet program adopted the name Booker T. Washington Magnet High School. This location was originally intended to be a temporary solution immediately after Normandale's unfortunate demise, but the school adapted and found over time that the building was suitable for its needs.

In August 2018, a fire destroyed some of the buildings on campus which contained areas including the school library, counselor's office, MPS child nutrition center, and the visual art, photography, broadcast media, and C.A.T. magnets.

Hayneville Road Elementary School (2018–present)
Since 2018, BTW has been relocated at the site of the former Hayneville Road Elementary School. Montgomery Public School purchased the former Holy Cross Episcopal School to be the new home of Booker T. Washington Magnet High School. An additional 100,000 square feet will be added to host the black box theater, new cafeteria, etc. The project is expected to be complete by January 2023.

History of Booker T. Washington High School
Booker T. Washington High School began in early 1865 as a primary school for African Americans. In 1916, an additional building was erected at Union and Grove Streets.

In 1937, plans were made to open a senior high school. A thirty-room unit was constructed after several of the original structures were demolished in 1948, and a 123-foot underground tunnel was developed to connect the two sides of the campus. The former auditorium-gymnasium was constructed in 1954.

In 1956, Booker T. Washington became a high school.

Awards and recognition 
 #3 in Montgomery, AL Metro High Schools; #28 in Alabama High Schools; #245 in Magnet High Schools in National Rankings by U.S. News & World Report
 #19 on AL.com's list of 30 best public high schools in Alabama for 2019
 #25 on Niche's list of 2020 Best Public High Schools in Alabama
 Grade A from the Alabama Department of Education Report Card
 Gold Medal, A+ College Ready Schools by U.S. News & World Report
 Your Start In The Arts High School Drama Grant Winner from the New York Conservatory For Dramatic Arts

Notable alumni 

 Albert Allenback (BTW, c/o 2012), musician and member of Tank and the Bangas 
 Foster Dickson, writer
 Jessica Grant, actor
 Glenn Howerton (CCPAC, c/o 1994), actor
 Chintia Kirana, (BTW, c/o 2005), visual artist
 Andy Mills, actor
 Chika (BTW, c/o 2015), rapper
 Kimi Samson, musician
 Wendy (White) Sasser, dancer
 Robert Shimp, record engineer and producer
 Daniel Sparkman, press secretary for the Governor of Alabama
 Johnny Veres, musician and member of Electric Blue Yonder

Notable staff 
Zestlan Simmons, AP Language and Composition - NMSI Teacher of the Year 2012–2013 in English

References

External links 
 

Magnet schools in Alabama
Schools in Montgomery, Alabama
Performing arts in Alabama